Seebach is a small river of Bavaria, Germany. It is the left headwater of the Laufach in Hain.

See also

List of rivers of Bavaria

Rivers of Bavaria
Rivers of Germany